This is a list of extinct animals of the British Isles, including extirpated species. Only a small number of the listed species are globally extinct (most famously the Irish elk, great auk and woolly mammoth).  Most of the remainder survive to some extent outside the islands. The list includes introduced species only in cases where they were able to form self-sustaining colonies for a time.  Only Pleistocene species, and specifically those extinct since the Ipswichian interglacial (c. 130,000 - c. 115,000 before present (BP)), Devensian glaciation (c. 115,000 – c. 11,700 BP) or into the Holocene (c. 11,700 BP - present), are included (that is, the assemblage that can be approximately considered the 'modern' fauna which displays insular differences from the mainland European fauna). The date beside each species is the last date when a specimen was observed in the wild or, where this is not known, the approximate date of extinction.

Overview
For most of its history, the British Isles were part of the main continent of Eurasia, linked by the region now known as Doggerland. Throughout the Pleistocene (Ice age) the climate alternated between cold glacial periods, including times when the climate was too cold to support much fauna, and temperate interglacials when a much larger fauna was present. Insularity first occurred around 125,000 BP, during the Ipswichian interglacial, when a warming climate raised sea levels and flooded Doggerland. This temperate climate supported an assemblage of species characterised by straight-tusked elephant (Palaeodoxodon antiquus). Around 115,000 BP the climate began to cool again as the Devensian glaciation began. The temperate species began to go extinct locally (many survived in southern refugia elsewhere in Europe). With the cooling climate, the sea level fell and by 60,000 BP a land bridge reformed so new or returning species could repopulate Britain. The colder climate supported a biome favoured by woolly mammoths (Mammuthus primigenius). By around 20,000 BP the climate was so cold, with much of Britain under ice and the rest a polar desert, so that little life could survive, and the glacial fauna also went extinct. The climate began to warm again around 11,700 BP, entering the present climatic period known as the Holocene. Animals repopulated Britain and Ireland. Many of the former species had gone extinct during the interval, but the majority of the surviving European temperate fauna, and some new immigrants, including modern humans (Homo sapiens), were able to reach Britain until the rising sea level once again isolated the islands. Great Britain was cut off from mainland Europe in around 8,200 BP by the Storegga Slide tsunami flooding Doggerland.

Extinctions in Britain over the period have thus had three main causes:
 Climate change as the ecosystem swung from temperate woodland and pasture, through open mammoth steppe to uninhabitable polar desert, and back.
 Habitat loss brought about by human activities, such as the clearing of woodland or draining of marshland.
 Hunting by humans.

It is important to remember that absence of evidence is not evidence of absence; the fossil record is always incomplete; and many of the early dates are very approximate, since caves in Britain were often excavated before modern archaeological stratifications and dating techniques.

Key
† - A species that is globally extinct
* - A species that is known to have been introduced by humans and was never present by natural immigration.

Some animals have gone extinct several times and then recolonized. The date given is of the most recent extinction. Species that have been introduced or reintroduced by humans are noted.

Mammals

Birds

Common crane – late medieval period (re-established)
Dalmatian pelican – c. 1000 B.C.
Gadfly petrel (unknown Pterodroma species, presumed Fea's petrel) – Iron Age
Eurasian spoonbill – 17th century (as a breeding bird) (re-established)
†Great auk – 1844
Great bustard – 19th century (reintroduced)
Kentish plover – 20th century (last breeding record 1979) 
Little egret – late medieval period (re-established)
Pied avocet – 19th century (re-established)
Red-backed shrike – 1989 (as a regular breeding bird)]
Western capercaillie – 1780s (reintroduced)
Hazel grouse – Last Glacial Period and only found in South West England 
White stork – 1416 (reintroduced) 
Wryneck (as a regular breeding bird)
White-tailed eagle – 1916 (reintroduced)
Lanner falcon - 1236–1300 (change of climate
Western marsh harrier – late 19th century (re-established)
Northern goshawk – late 19th century (re-established) 
Red kite - 1870s (England), 1886 (Scotland), (reintroduced)
Osprey – 1916 (re-established)
Eurasian eagle owl - c. 8000 BP (re-established)
Boreal owl - went extinct in mainland Britain due to change of climate after Last Glacial Period.
Northern hawk owl - went extinct in mainland Britain due to change of climate after Last Glacial Period.
Snowy owl - went extinct in mainland Britain due to change of climate after Last Glacial Period

Fish

 Burbot – A fisherman caught the last recorded burbot in July 1970 from the Great Ouse Relief Channel, Norfolk. The species was then presumed extinct. (There are efforts to re-introduce this species into the rivers of East Anglia)
†Houting – In the UK, the houting was declared extinct in 1977 by D. A. Ratcliffe. It was last recorded in the UK from the River Colne, West Yorkshire in 1925.

Amphibians

Agile frog – c. 1000, possibly 1500 present on Jersey
European tree frog – 1986
Moor frog – c. 1000, possibly 1500
Pool frog – 1999 (reintroduced)

Reptiles

Aesculapian snake – c. Atlantic period >3000 BP (escaped populations in London and North Wales)
European pond turtle – ≤ 3000 BP (possible escaped colonies established)
Western green lizard – c. unknown (escaped populations in Bournemouth); present on Jersey and Guernsey

Insects

Beetles

Agonum sahlbergi (ground beetle) – 1914
Platycerus caraboides (blue stag beetle) – 19th century
Graphoderus bilineatus (water beetle) – 1906
Harpalus honestus (ground beetle) – 1905
Copris lunaris (horned dung beetle) – 1974
Ochthebius aeneus (water beetle) – 1913
Platydema violaceum (tenebrionid) – 1957
Rhantus aberratus (water beetle) – 1904
Scybalicus oblongiusculus (ground beetle) – 1926
Teretrius fabricii (histerid) – 1907

Bees, wasps and ants

Andrena polita (mining bee) – 1934
Bombus pomorum (apple bumblebee) – 1864
Bombus cullumanus (Cullum's bumblebee) – 1941
Eucera tuberculata (mining bee) – 1941
Halictus maculatus (mining bee) – 1930
Mellinus crabroneus (digger wasp) – c. 1950
Odynerus reniformis (mason wasp) – 1915
Odynerus simillimus (mason wasp) – 1905
Bombus subterraneus (short-haired bumblebee) – 1989

Flies

Merodon clavipes

Butterflies and moths

General reference: Waring et al., 2009.
Aporia crataegi, black-veined white – 1925
Borkhausenia minutella – 1950
Lithophane furcifera, conformist (moth) –
Euclemensia woodiella (moth) – 1829
Flame brocade (moth) – 1919
Frosted yellow (moth) – 1914
Gypsy moth – 1907; reappeared 1995
Isle of Wight wave (moth) – 1931
Large chequered skipper – c. 1989 (non-native, Channel Islands)
Large copper – 1865
Large tortoiseshell - 1960s (recolonising from 2019)
Many-lined (moth) – 1875
Map – c. 1914 (non-native)
Mazarine blue – 1906
Orache moth – 1915
Reed tussock (moth) – 1875
Scarce black arches (moth) – 1898 (transitory resident)
Speckled beauty (moth) – 1898
Union rustic (moth) – 1919
Viper's bugloss (moth) – 1969

Dragonflies and damselflies

Norfolk damselfly – 1957
Orange-spotted emerald (dragonfly) – 1957

Caddisflies

Hydropsyche bulgaromanorum (caddis fly) – 1926
Hydropsyche exocellata (caddis fly) – 1901

Cicada
Cicadetta montana (New Forest cicada) – not seen in Britain since 2000.

Arachnids
Gibbaranea bituberculata — 1954
Hypsosinga heri — 1912
Mastigusa arietina — 1926

Crustaceans
Artemia salina (brine shrimp) – after 1758

Molluscs

Land snails
Fruticicola fruticum
Cernuella neglecta

Reintroduction and re-establishment

The white-tailed eagle has been successfully re-established on the western coast of Scotland. Having clung on in parts of Wales, red kites have been successfully re-established in parts of England and Scotland. Ongoing projects involve both these species: the corn crake into parts of England and Scotland, and the great bustard on Salisbury Plain.

European beavers have been reintroduced to parts of Scotland, and there are plans to bring them back to other parts of Britain. A five-year trial reintroduction at Knapdale in Argyll started in 2009 and concluded in 2014. A few hundred beavers live wild in the Tay river basin, as a result of escapes from a wildlife park. A similar reintroduction trial is being undertaken on the river otter in Devon, England. Also, around the country, beavers have been introduced into fenced reserves for many reasons including flood prevention. In 2016, beavers were recognised as a British native species, and will be protected under law.

In 2008, Eurasian elk were released into a fenced reserve on the Alladale Estate in the Highlands of Scotland. Reindeer were re-established in 1952; approximately 150–170 reindeer live around the Cairngorms region in Scotland.

Set up by the Wildwood Trust, Konik horses have been established across many reserves as a proxy for the extinct tarpan.

In 1998, MAFF, now known as DEFRA released a report concerning the presence of two populations of wild boar living freely in the UK. These boar are thought to have escaped from wildlife parks, zoos and from farms where they are farmed for their meat, and gone on to establish breeding populations.

Around 20 white storks pass through the UK each year. A colony at the Knepp Wildland in West Sussex, aided by zoologist Roisin Campbell-Palmer, hopes to reinforce these off-path migrants by introducing adults into a fenced reserve, where the juveniles born will be able to establish other colonies further afield.

The northern clade of the pool frog was reintroduced from Swedish stock in 2005, to a single site in Norfolk, England, following detailed research to prove that it had been native before its extinction around 1993.

Smaller species, mainly reptiles, such as the green lizard and Aesculapian snake, have formed colonies probably due to a result of release from captivity. There have also been calls for the return of the European tree frog to the wild.

Established in 2020, Celtic Reptile & Amphibian, aims to reintroduce the lost species of reptile and amphibian that once inhabited Britain, back to rewilding projects. These include the moor frog, European tree frog, agile frog and European pond turtle. They have already had significant success breeding the moor frog in captivity. The organisation also wants to see European pond turtles re-established within wetland restoration projects.

The large blue butterfly has been successfully re-established from Swedish stock at several sites, but very few of these are open-access. There are also several successful cases of the establishment of new populations of heath fritillary.

There have been calls for the reintroduction of the Eurasian lynx, brown bear and grey wolf to the UK, because no large predators are living in viable populations in Great Britain. It is theorized that a large predators presence could create a trophic cascade, thus improving the ecosystem.

There are plans to reintroduce European bison into England in spring 2022. The initial reintroduction would consist of one male and three females being released into a 150-hectare area with no accessible footpaths.

See also
 List of mammals of the British Isles
 Extinct animals from the Isle of Man
 List of extinct animals of Europe
 List of extinct plants of the British Isles
 Introduced species of the British Isles
 Timeline of prehistoric Britain

References

Further reading
A Short History of the British Mammal Fauna (archived)
The History of British Birds
Buglife on bumblebees
Joint Nature Conservation Committee – Invertebrates extinct in the last 100 years

Britain
Britain
Extinct
Extinct animals